

QG51A Antiinfectives and antiseptics for intrauterine use

QG51AA Antibacterials
QG51AA01 Oxytetracycline
QG51AA02 Tetracycline
QG51AX03 Amoxicillin
QG51AA04 Gentamicin
QG51AX05 Cefapirin
QG51AA06 Rifaximin
QG51AA07 Cefquinome
QG51AA08 Chlortetracycline
QG51AA09 Formosulfathiazole

QG51AD Antiseptics
QG51AD01 Povidone-iodine
QG51AD02 Policresulen
QG51AD03 Peroxy-acetic acid
QG51AD30 Combinations of antiseptics

QG51AG Antiinfectives and/or antiseptics, combinations for intrauterine use
QG51AG01 Procaine benzylpenicillin, dihydrostreptomycin and sulfadimidine
QG51AG02 Benzylpenicillin, dihydrostreptomycin and sulfadimidine
QG51AG03 Tetracycline, neomycin and sulfadimidine
QG51AG04 Ampicillin and oxacillin
QG51AG05 Ampicillin and cloxacillin
QG51AG06 Oxytetracycline and neomycin
QG51AG07 Ampicillin and colistin

References

G51